The 1st Separate Women's Volunteer Rifle Brigade was an independent brigade of the Soviet Union military created from the order of the State Defense Committee Resolution No GFCS-2470SS in 1942. Originally part of the Red Army, the unit was transferred to the NKVD in 1943 after the arrest of its deputy combat commander, Major Vera Krylova. In 1944 the brigade was disbanded.

References

All-female military units and formations
Red Army units and formations of World War II
 
 
Brigades of the Soviet Union
NKVD